Kevin T. Mitchell (born April 6, 1985) is a former American football safety. Mitchell was signed by the Washington Redskins of the National Football League on April 29, 2008, but was released on May 6, 2008.

Kevin's father Stephen played football for the Indiana Hoosiers, his uncle Jon Hayes played football at Purdue University, and his brother Phil Hayes played for Arkansas.

High school
Mitchell attended Homestead Senior High School in Fort Wayne, Indiana.

College career
Kevin Mitchell majored in speech communications while at University of Illinois at Urbana-Champaign.

On the football field, Mitchell was a captain for the Illinois Fighting Illini Football, including Illinois' appearance in the 2008 Rose Bowl.

NFL career
Mitchell went undrafted in the 2008 NFL Draft, but on April 29, 2008, he signed with the Redskins. Washington later released him on May 6, 2008.

He is now an assistant coach at the University of New Mexico.

References

1985 births
Living people
Players of American football from Fort Wayne, Indiana
American football safeties
Illinois Fighting Illini football players
Washington Redskins players